Burapitant (SSR-240,600) is a drug developed by Sanofi-Aventis which was one of the first compounds developed that acts as a potent and selective antagonist for the NK1 receptor. While burapitant itself did not proceed beyond early clinical trials and was never developed for clinical use in humans, promising animal results from this and related compounds have led to a number of novel drugs from this class that have now been introduced into medical use.

References 

NK1 receptor antagonists
Trifluoromethyl compounds
Chlorobenzenes